Fort Thomas is a home rule-class city in Campbell County, Kentucky, United States, on the southern bank of the Ohio River and the site of an 1890 US Army post. The population was 16,325 at the 2010 census, making it the largest city in Campbell County and it is officially part of the Cincinnati – Northern Kentucky metropolitan area.

History

Evidence suggests that on or around 1749, prior to settlement by Europeans, a large battle occurred between a band of Cherokee Native Americans and victorious Miami tribe and Shawnee tribe Native Americans in what is now the city of Fort Thomas. As many as 600 graves of slain warriors have been unearthed by archeologists there; although the battleground area has been thoroughly combed for artifacts and remains over the years, it is still not uncommon to find arrowheads and other artifacts from the past while gardening or hiking the woods and streambeds throughout the city.

Fort Thomas Army Post
In 1887, a site was needed to house a United States Army post to replace Newport Barracks located in the adjoining city of Newport, Kentucky. Built in 1803, Newport Barracks replaced the smaller Fort Washington, located across the Ohio River in Cincinnati, Ohio. That army post was located at the junction of the Licking and Ohio Rivers, but it was prone to flooding and flooded numerous times during the early 1880s. A new, less flood prone location was sought. General Philip Sheridan personally selected  of the city and dubbed the area the Highlands, predicting it to become the "West Point of the West." The new post was named Fort Thomas in honor of General George Henry Thomas.

It was the 16th structure built on the grounds of the Military Reservation. It encloses a standpipe which has a capacity of 100,000 gallons, pumped from the Water District reservoirs just across South Fort Thomas Avenue. In 1890 when the military base was established, such provisions for water supply was necessary as there was no other water tower in this area. Cannons that were captured in Cuba's Havana Harbor during the Spanish–American War rest on stone platforms in front of the Tower. The dates marked on these cannons, reflecting the date they were made in Barcelona, Spain, are "1768" and "1769."

The U.S. 6th Infantry Regiment moved to Fort Thomas, where it remained until called to action again in June 1898, in the Spanish–American War. 

Also stationed at Fort Thomas during the Spanish–American War were the 8th Volunteer Infantry, known as the "8th Immunes." At the time, many erroneously believed that African Americans were naturally immune to tropical diseases or at least were better suited for service in the tropical environment of the Caribbean, and fearing the outbreak of tropical disease, actively recruited African-American soldiers for the conflict. Also, active service in the armed forces was considered beneficial to the status of African Americans in the United States, and was therefore lobbied for by civil rights leaders at the time. Booker T. Washington wrote the Secretary of the Navy that Cuba's climate was "peculiar and danger[o]us to the unaclimated [sic] white man. The Negro race in the South is accustomed to this climate." Other black leaders lobbied in Washington to reserve all ten regiments for their race. Although they lacked the political clout to accomplish that lofty goal, President McKinley was well aware that most states had refused to accept black volunteers, and he wanted to recognize the martial spirit of the minority that staunchly supported his Republican party. On 26 May, the adjutant general's office issued General Orders, No. 55, indicating that five of the Immune regiments would be composed of "persons of color," commanded by officers who were also people of color. The others were composed of white men who had already contracted tropical diseases.

Samuel Woodfill was transferred to the Fort Thomas Army Post in 1912. He married Lorena Wiltshire on Christmas Day in 1917 and they purchased a house near the fort. In World War I he was courageous, leading his men against the Germans. His bravery earned him the Medal of Honor and other awards and he was described as the most decorated soldier of the war. In civilian life, however, he struggled to pay his bills. He was unsuccessful at creating an orchard, and worked as a carpenter, a watchman and a guard. His wife died in March 1942, but two months later, the Army commissioned Woodfill and another World War I hero, Alvin C. York as Majors to build morale and promote enlistments. Woodfill retired again in 1944, but memories of his wife in Fort Thomas caused him to return to Indiana, where he was born.

On February 25, 1937, Paul Tibbets enlisted here as a flying cadet in the United States Army Air Corps. During the last days of World War II, Paul became known as the pilot that dropped the first atomic bomb on August 6, 1945.

Fort Thomas served as a depot, induction center, and military hospital.  Most of the garrison was transferred to the Veterans Administration in 1946, but military activities continued until the fort was closed in 1964.

Geography
Fort Thomas is located at  (39.076011, −84.451273).

Climate
Fort Thomas is located within a climatic transition zone at the extreme northern limit of the humid subtropical climate. The local climate is a basically a blend of the subtropics to the south and the humid continental climate to the north. There are several "micro-climates" found in Fort Thomas which produce warmer than usual or cooler than usual "pockets". In the warmer niches it is not at all uncommon to find such "subtropical" novelties as the common wall lizard, the Southern magnolia (Magnolia grandiflora), and even the rare Dwarf palmetto; Blue spruce and Salamander tend to occur in the cooler and shaded niches. Moderating variables for the overall climate of Fort Thomas include: the Ohio River, the region's relatively large hills and valleys, and an urban heat influence due to the proximity of the Cincinnati/Northern Kentucky (Covington, Newport, etc.) metropolitan area. Fort Thomas is located within the Bluegrass region of Kentucky and Southern Ohio and is also situated within the northern periphery of the Upland South.

Demographics

As of the census of 2010, there were 16,325 people, 6,787 households, and 4,219 families residing in the city. The racial makeup of the city was 96.1% White, 1.3% African American, 0.1% Native American, 0.9% Asian, less than 0.01% Pacific Islander, 0.4% from other races, and 1.2% from two or more races. Hispanic or Latino of any race were 1.4% of the population.

There were 6,787 households, out of which 30.1% had children under the age of 18 living with them, 48.8% were married couples living together, 9.7% had a female householder with no husband present, and 37.8% were non-families. 32.6% of all households were made up of individuals, and 12.5% had someone living alone who was 65 years of age or older. The average household size was 2.35 and the average family size was 3.03.

In the city the population was spread out, with 24.2% under the age of 18, 7.7% from 18 to 24, 25.1% from 25 to 44, 27.4% from 45 to 64, and 15.6% who were 65 years of age or older. The median age was 39.8 years. For every 100 females, there were 90.6 males. For every 100 females age 18 and over, there were 84.5 males.

The median income for a household in the city was $49,575, and the median income for a family was $63,006. Males had a median income of $43,733 versus $30,209 for females. The per capita income for the city was $26,657. About 2.8% of families and 4.8% of the population were below the poverty line, including 4.7% of those under age 18 and 3.2% of those age 65 or over.

Education
Fort Thomas has an independent public school district with 3 elementary schools (Robert D. Johnson Elementary, Ruth Moyer Elementary, and Samuel Woodfill Elementary), Highlands Middle School, and Highlands High School, which are consistently ranked among the top in the country. Highlands High School is the only public high school in the state with a Cum Laude Society chapter.

The mascot for Highlands is the bluebird. According to local legend, in the early twentieth century the original mascot for the school was the Highlands Blue Devil. A local clergyman objected to the association of the community to the devil. At the time, the boys' track team had an exceptionally good year and it was remarked that they "flew like birds." This gave rise to the new and current mascot.

The Highlands football program is one of the most storied in all of Kentucky. Highlands has won 20 official state football championships and three "mythical" state titles prior to Kentucky instituting a statewide playoff system. The Bluebirds currently rank second in the state and fifth in the entire nation in total number of wins. Former NFL player Jared Lorenzen starred in football at Highlands. He signed as a free-agent with the Giants after attending the University of Kentucky. Michael Mitchell, who was drafted in 2009 by the Oakland Raiders with the 47th pick, played football at Highlands. Ben Guidugli, who was also a member of Highlands Football, played TE at the University of Cincinnati and was picked up as free agent by the St. Louis Rams in 2011.

The school has won girls' cross country championships in 1978–1980, 2002–2004 and 2012–2015 and has won back to back girls' soccer championships (2005–2006). The boys and girls soccer teams were State Runner-up in 2008, the first time in state history both teams made the finals from one school. The girls' track team won consecutive state championships in 2008 and 2009.

The Highlands band, has also received recognition. The marching band placed sixth in the KMEA State semi-finals competition in November 2005. They also achieved 5th place in November 2009, only missing Finals by a quarter of a point. In May 2007, the concert band received a distinguished rating, the highest, in the Kentucky State Concert Band Festival at the University of Louisville.

The Highlands Girls Tennis Team has also won regionals and qualified for the state tournament four years running.

There are two Catholic private schools in the city, Saint Thomas Elementary and Saint Catherine Elementary.

Fort Thomas has a public library, a branch of the Campbell County Public Library.

Media
Fort Thomas is situated on the southern border of the Ohio River, directly opposite of Cincinnati, Ohio. Therefore, the major media market for the city is Cincinnati. Fort Thomas then uses Cincinnati's television and radio outlets.

 Television:
 WLWT (NBC), Channel 5
 WCPO (ABC), Channel 9
 WKRC (CBS), Channel 12
 WXIX (FOX), Channel 19
 Print Media:
 Weekly Paper
 The Fort Thomas Recorder, a special edition of The Campbell County Recorder, delivered free to the city's residence but donation is suggested with the majority of the proceeds  going to the delivery boy or girl. 
 Magazine
 Fort Thomas Living, a monthly magazine sent through the mail as a free subscription to residents of Fort Thomas. FTL is also available at local newsstands. It was established in 1977.
 Digital Media
 Fort Thomas Matters, is a daily news website. The site is focused on current events and includes commentary of political and civic events in the community.
 Fort Thomas Matters Radio is a podcast dealing with local, region and state politics.

Notable people
 Pearl Bryan, woman murdered in 1896
 Jim Bunning, Republican Senator and member of National Baseball Hall of Fame who early in political career served on city council.
 Cris Collinsworth, former Cincinnati Bengals wide receiver and television sportscaster for NBC
 Harlan Hubbard, artist
 Lucien Hubbard, Oscar-winning film producer
 Jerome P. Keuper, founder and president of Florida Institute of Technology
 Jared Lorenzen, former New York Giants quarterback
 Mike Mitchell, Pittsburgh Steelers safety
 Jeff Walz, head coach of the University of Louisville women's basketball team
 Samuel Woodfill, one of the most decorated soldiers of World War I
 John Schlarman, former Kentucky football player and coach

See also
 List of cities and towns along the Ohio River
 Engels Maps

Notes

References
 Crowley, Patrick(1997). "Having cake and eating it, too", The Cincinnati Enquirer.
 BluegrassPreps.com (2005).
 History section is based primarily from the city's official website.
 Collier, Mark (2013). Yes, Fort Thomas Matters. WCPO. 
 Collier, Mark. (2015). FTM Radio. Podbean, iTunes, Google Play.

External links
 City of Fort Thomas
 Historical Images and Texts of Fort Thomas
 Fort Thomas news source, digital

Cities in Campbell County, Kentucky
Populated places established in 1867
Kentucky populated places on the Ohio River
Cities in Kentucky